Darwin's ringed worm lizard (Amphisbaena darwinii) is a species of amphisbaenian in the family Amphisbaenidae, endemic to South America.

Etymology
The specific name, darwinii, is in honor of English naturalist Charles Darwin.

Geographic range
A. darwinii lives in Argentina, Brazil, Paraguay, and Uruguay.

Habitat
The preferred natural habitat of A. darwinii is grassland.

Description

Behavior
A. darwinii is fossorial.

Reproduction
A. darwinii is oviparous.

References

Further reading
Borteiro C, Kolenc F, Verdes JM (2013). "Aggregative behaviour in the fossorial lizard Amphisbaena darwinii (Squamata, Amphisbaenidae)". Cuadernos de Herpetología 27 (1): 57–58.
Duméril AMC, Bibron G (1839). Erpétologie générale, ou, Histoire naturelle complète des Reptiles, Tome cinquième [Volume 5]. Paris: Roret. viii + 854 pp. (Amphisbæna darwinii, new species, pp. 490–492). (in French).
Gans C (1966). "Studies on amphisbaenids (Amphisbaenia, Reptilia). 3. The small species from southern South America commonly identified as Amphisbaena darwinii ". Bulletin of the American Museum of Natural History 134: 185–260.

External links

Amphisbaena (lizard)
Reptiles described in 1839
Taxa named by André Marie Constant Duméril
Taxa named by Gabriel Bibron